Chan Pak Hei (Chinese: 陳柏熹; born 26 March 1997 in Hong Kong) is a former Hong Kong professional footballer who currently plays for Hong Kong First Division club Hoi King.

College career
Chan spent his college career at Campbellsville and Fresno Pacific.

References

External links
Chan Pak Hei at HKFA

Living people
1997 births
Hong Kong people
Hong Kong footballers
Hong Kong Premier League players
Hong Kong First Division League players
Association football midfielders
Association football wingers
Association football forwards
Tuen Mun SA players
TSW Pegasus FC players
Hoi King SA players